The Timișaț is a right tributary of the river Timiș in Romania. It discharges into the Timiș in Grăniceri. It has been canalized for most of its length, and is used as a drainage canal for the area between the rivers Bega and Timiș. For a short reach of 95 m the Timișaț defines the border between Romania and Serbia.

References

Rivers of Romania
Rivers of Timiș County